Ortigueira, a seaport and borough in County Ferrolterra (A Coruña) in Galicia, celebrates its patron saint day -Saint Martha of Ortigueira's Day- on 29 July.

Held during Saint Martha's day, Ortigueira's Festival of Celtic World (Festival Internacional do Mundo Celta de Ortigueira) is the highlight of the borough's summertime festival calendar. The festival lasts for four days, Thursday to Sunday, and is free.

The main stage is located in the port, and it has hosted performances by Celtic music groups of great level and international fame, such as Alan Stivell or The Chieftains, among many others. Since the 2000 edition in the surroundings of the port rises a smaller stage, the Runas stage, where a jury competition is held between new groups. The prize to the winner is the performance in the main stage in the edition of the following year. Free campsites are available on the beach of Morouzos and in the pine grove for people who go to the festival.

It is considered a Festival of International Tourist Interest and is one of the largest folk festivals in terms of number of attendees from all over Europe, having occasionally surpassed 100,000 attendees per edition.

History
The inaugural festival was organised in 1978 by the Escola de Gaitas de Ortigueira. It was held from 1978 to 1987 and has been held since 1995.

Groups participating in the festival of Ortigueira
2017: Noreia (Slovenia), Gabriel G Diges (Ireland), Koji Koji Moheji (Japan), Skerryvore (Scotland), Crebisnky (Galicia), Bagad Kevren Brest Sant Mark, Escola de Gaitas de Ortigueira, Usher's Island, Scott Wood Band, Böj, The California and District Pipe Band, Oscar Ibañez & Tribo, Michael McGoldrick Band, Tejedor, Harmonica Creams, Gamelas e Anduriñas, Os Carecos e Amigos, Treixadura e Cantigas e Agarimos and A Roda.

2018: Brumafolk (Cantabria), The Taverners (Castela e León), Beltaine (Poland), Ímar (Scotland/Wales), Escola De Gaitas De Ortigueira (Galicia), The National Youth Pipe Band of Scotland (Scotland), Kila (Ireland), Rubén Alba (Asturias), Os D’abaixo (Galicia), Milladoiro (Galicia), Yves Lambert Project (Canada), Gabriel G Diges (Ireland), Airiños De Fene (Galicia), Lúnasa (Ireland), The Celtic Social Club (Brittany).

See also
 Galician traditional music

References

External links
Festival Internacional do Mundo Celta de Ortigueira
Celtic Nations
Celtic Countries Magazine

Music festivals in Spain
Galician culture
Tourist attractions in Galicia (Spain)
Celtic music festivals
Folk festivals in Spain
Music festivals established in 1978